Oliver Appropriate is the eighth studio album by American rock band Say Anything released on January 25, 2019 via Dine Alone Records. The album is a concept album and purported sequel to the band's second full-length album, ...Is a Real Boy, which follows the narrator of said album and his struggles with sexuality.

Background
Following the anniversary tour for In Defense of the Genre, the band announced their signing to Dine Alone Records and that they were working with Will Yip on a new LP. On August 16, 2018, frontman Max Bemis released a 10-page PDF statement in which he announced plans to end the band and to release an eighth and possibly final album with no supporting tour. The origin of the album came about after Bemis discovered the Indie rock band Museum Mouth through their third studio album "Alex I Am Nothing." Bemis connected with the album's concept of a man's unrequited love of a straight guy. Through front-man, Karl Kuehn's, song-writing Bemis was inspired to create the character of Oliver as well as publicly coming out as bisexual.

Concept
The character of "Oliver" is said by Bemis to be loosely based on himself. He is the singer of a burnt-out "emo/indie punk" band past their peak who cheats on his girlfriends and parties to the point of hurting himself and those around him. The album chronicles two days in Oliver's life starting with him waking up hungover, falling in love with a guy named Karl (based on Kuehn) and rejecting him due to being in denial about his own sexuality. After he loses his job on the second day he seeks out Karl who then rejects him, leading him to murder him and then drown himself tied to his corpse and a large stone.

Critical reception

Oliver Appropriate received generally favorable reviews according to Metacritic, which assigns a normalized rating out reviews from mainstream publications. In a four-star review from Sarah Jamieson with DIY Magazine she said that "the band yet again manage to navigate the realms of pointedly apt social commentary with a razor sharp wit." She also said the album was a more intimate journey than "...Is a Real Boy" and that it is "flecked with tales of weakness and failure, beauty and humour."

Rob Mair from Upset Magazine described the album is being "full of solid gold pop-songs" However, in a more mixed review, Arielle Gordon from Pitchfork described the record’s plotline as "muddied and morally ambiguous at best". Loudwire named it one of the 50 best rock albums of 2019.

Track listing

Personnel
According to AllMusic.
 Max Bemis - lead vocals, guitar, keyboards, bass
 Karl Kuehn - drums, vocals
 Will Yip - bass, drums, engineering, mastering, mixing, percussion, producer, programming
 Sherri DuPree - vocals
 Brianna Collins - vocals
 Coraline Bemis - vocals
 Lucy Bemis - vocals
 Jonathan Simmons - vocals
 Justin Anstotz - assistant engineer
 Phillip Odom - assistant engineer
 Vince Ratti - mixing

Chart performance

References 

2019 albums
Say Anything (band) albums
Dine Alone Records albums
Albums produced by Will Yip
Concept albums